Blepharis mitrata is a species of plant in the family Acanthaceae. It is found in subtropical or tropical dry shrubland and rocky areas of Namibia, such as the Khomas Honchland. It is threatened by habitat loss. The whole plant is very spiny.

In traditional medicine

The fruits, seeds and roots of Blepharis mitrata are claimed to be useful for hemorrhoids, cough, wounds and fontanel hardening, though further analysis is needed to determine its true medical value.

References

mitrata
Flora of Namibia
Least concern plants